Kambel-e Soleyman Rural District is a rural district (dehestan) in the Central District of Chabahar County, Sistan and Baluchestan province, Iran. At the 2006 census, its population was 21,803, in 4,285 families. The rural district has 52 villages. At the 2016 census, its population had risen to 24,735.

References 

Chabahar County
Rural Districts of Sistan and Baluchestan Province
Populated places in Chabahar County